Bois D'Arc Township (T12N W½R4+R5W) is located in Montgomery County, Illinois, United States. As of the 2010 census, its population was 956 and it contained 451 housing units.

Geography

Demographics

Adjacent townships
 Divernon Township, Sangamon County (north)
 Pawnee Township, Sangamon County (north)
 South Fork Township, Christian County (northeast)
 King Township, Christian County (east)
 Harvel Township (southeast)
 Pitman Township (south)
 Nilwood Township, Macoupin County (southwest)
 Girard Township (west)
 Virden Township (west)
 Auburn Township, Sangamon County (northwest)

References

External links
City-data.com
Illinois State Archives
Historical Society of Montgomery County Illinois

Townships in Montgomery County, Illinois
1872 establishments in Illinois
Townships in Illinois